Buiú is a Brazilian nickname. Notable people with the name include:

Buiú (footballer, born 1980), full name Aldieres Joaquim dos Santos Neto, Brazilian footballer
Buiú (footballer, born 1996), full name Marcos Ytalo Benício da Silva, Brazilian footballer

Lists of people by nickname